Marta Lach (born 26 May 1997) is a Polish professional racing cyclist, who currently rides for UCI Women's Continental Team . She rode in the women's road race at the 2016 UCI Road World Championships, but she did not finish the race.

Personal life
She comes from Głębowice and she is studying in University School of Physical Education in Kraków. She has a younger brother, Michał, who is an amateur cyclist.

Major results
2020
 1st  Road race, National Road Championships
2021
 1st La Picto–Charentaise
2022
 1st Stage 3 Tour de Romandie
 2nd Trofeo Oro in Euro

References

External links
 

1997 births
Living people
Polish female cyclists
Place of birth missing (living people)
Olympic cyclists of Poland
Cyclists at the 2020 Summer Olympics
21st-century Polish women